West Street Mob were an American boogie and electro music trio, active between 1981 and 1984, best known for their 1983 song "Break Dance — Electric Boogie." The band comprised Joey Robinson, Jr., Warren Moore and singer Sabrina Gillison.

History
In 1981, West Street Mob recorded their eponymous album, which peaked at No. 57 on the Billboard Black Albums chart. The single "Let's Dance" peaked at No. 18 on the Black Singles chart and No. 22 on the Dance chart.

In 1983. the group released its second album, Break Dance – Electric Boogie. The title track contains a sample of Incredible Bongo Band's 1973 recording of "Apache," written by Jerry Lordan.

West Street Mob also recorded two singles that were not included on either of their two albums, "Ooh Baby" and "Sing a Simple Song."

The group is  well known for "Break Dance – Electric Boogie" being featured in the first of Judson Laipply's Evolution of Dance videos.

Joseph "Joey" Robinson Jr., son of Sugar Hill Records founder Sylvia Robinson, died of cancer on July 11, 2015, in Tenafly, New Jersey, at the age of 53.

Discography

Studio albums

"—" denotes the single failed to chart

Singles

 "—" denotes the single failed to chart
C also peaked at #95 on the Cashbox pop chart.

References

American boogie musicians
American electro musicians
American funk musical groups
American hip hop groups
American musical trios
Sugar Hill Records (hip hop label) artists